The Interstate Intercollegiate Athletic Conference (IIAC) was a college athletic conference that existed from 1908 to 1970 in the United States.

At one time the Illinois Intercollegiate Athletic Conference, or IIAC, was a robust league that claimed most of the Illinois institutions of higher education. It was nicknamed the "Little Nineteen," but in 1928 had a membership of 23 schools.  Former Illinois State University track coach Joseph Cogdal, associated with the IIAC for 43 years of its 62-year history, noted that the league had roots in the 1870s when a number of schools banded together for oratorical contests. Their first intercollegiate football game was played in 1881 between Illinois State University and Knox College, and by 1894 a football association was established.

History
The IIAC was formed in April 1908 with eight charter members: Illinois State Normal University (now Illinois State University), Illinois Wesleyan University, Bradley Polytechnic Institute (now Bradley University), Millikin University, Monmouth College, Knox College, Lombard College and Illinois College. The first track meet was held on May 22, 1908. The group quickly expanded. Eastern Illinois State Teachers College (now Eastern Illinois University) and Western Illinois University joined in 1912 and 1914 respectively.

In 1920, the name "Illinois Intercollegiate Athletic Conference" was adopted, providing the initials IIAC.  Conference membership reached a peak of 23 member schools in 1928, when virtually all of the small colleges in Illinois were included.

Private schools withdrew during much of the 1930s, until in 1942 only the five state schools remained: Illinois State University, Eastern Illinois University, Northern Illinois University, Southern Illinois University Carbondale and Western Illinois University.  In 1950, the league name became the Interstate Intercollegiate Athletic Conference, when Central Michigan University and Eastern Michigan University brought the membership to seven. In 1961-62, Eastern Michigan University and Southern Illinois University Carbondale withdrew; Northern Illinois University followed in 1965-66.  The conference disbanded at the end of the 1969–70 academic year.

Member schools

Final members

Former members

Notes

Membership timeline

Football champions

Illinois Intercollegiate Athletic Conference

1910 – Illinois Wesleyan
1911 – 
1912 – Eastern Illinois, Carthage, and William & Vashti
1913 – Eastern Illinois and William & Vashti
1914 – Eastern Illinois
1915 – Illinois College
1916 – 
1917 – Lombard (IL)
1918 – No champion
1919 – 
1920 – , North Central, and Wheaton
1921 – 
1922 – 
1923 – Lombard

1924 –  and Lombard
1925 – Bradley and 
1926 – Bradley and 
1927 – Bradley

1928 – Eastern Illinois and 
1929 –  and 
1931 – 
1932 –  and 
1933 – 
1934 –  and 
1935 –  and 
1936 –  and 

1938 – Northern Illinois State
1939 – Western Illinois
1940 – Illinois State Normal
1941 – Illinois State Normal and Northern Illinois State
1942 – Western Illinois
1943 – No champion
1944 – Northern Illinois State
1945 – Illinois State Normal
1946 – Northern Illinois State
1947 – Southern Illinois
1948 – 
1949 – Western Illinois

Interstate Intercollegiate Athletic Conference

1950 – Illinois State Normal
1951 – Northern Illinois State
1952 – Central Michigan
1953 – Central Michigan
1954 – Central Michigan and Michigan State Normal 
1955 – Central Michigan and Michigan State Normal
1956 – Central Michigan

1957 – Eastern Michigan
1958 – Western Illinois
1959 – Western Illinois
1960 – Southern Illinois
1961 – Southern Illinois
1962 – Central Michigan
1963 – Northern Illinois

1964 – Northern Illinois and Western Illinois
1965 – Northern Illinois
1966 – Central Michigan
1967 – Central Michigan and Illinois State
1968 – Central Michigan and Illinois State
1969 – Western Illinois

See also
 List of Interstate Intercollegiate Athletic Conference football standings
 List of defunct college football conferences
 Mid-American Conference
 Missouri Valley Football Conference
 Ohio Valley Conference
 College Conference of Illinois and Wisconsin

References

External links
 Illinois Intercollegiate Athletic Conference

 
College sports in Illinois
College sports in Michigan
Sports leagues established in 1908
Sports leagues disestablished in 1970